Katy Carr is a musician.

Katy or Katie Carr may also refer to:

Katy Carr, protagonist in What Katy Did
Katie Carr, model
Katie Roe Carr, British television personality

See also
Catherine Carr (disambiguation)